Kim Eun-kyung may refer to:
Kim Eun-kyung (politician) (born 1956), former environment minister
Kim Eun-kyung (professor) (born 1965), professor of commercial law

See also
Kim Eun-kyeong (born 1991), South Korean handball player